The Gurten Funicular is a funicular railway in the southern suburbs of the Swiss capital city of Bern. The line links Wabern, in the municipality of Köniz, with the summit of the Gurten mountain (858 m), which overlooks the city of Bern. 

Wabern can be reached from the city centre by tram, train or car. Wabern bei Bern station, on lines S3 and S31 of the Bern S-Bahn, is adjacent to the lower station of the Gurtenbahn, as is the Gurtenbahn stop on Bern tramway route 9.

The line is owned and operated by the company Gurtenbahn Bern AG.

History 

The first concession for a line up the Gurten was granted in 1885 but never realized. A second concession was granted in 1893 and the line opened in 1899. In 1931 and 1932 the cars were overhauled and a new drive installed. In 1944 new cars were supplied and the lower station redesigned, with the upper station following in 1949. In 1966 the plant was renewed again.

In 1999, the line was completely rebuilt. All the stations were renovated, the drive was replaced,  and new panorama carriages were put into operation.

In 2015, the line carried over one million passengers, the largest annual ridership up until that year. In the same year, the line made a profit of around 250,000 Swiss francs.

Operation 

The line is operated by the Gurtenbahn company. It has the following parameters:

See also 

 List of funicular railways
 List of funiculars in Switzerland

Further reading

References

External links 

Official web site of the Gurtenbahn (in German)
Video of ride on funicular from the Gurten to Wabern

Funicular railways in Switzerland
Transport in Bern
Köniz
Railway lines opened in 1899
Metre gauge railways in Switzerland
1899 establishments in Switzerland